Francis Steegmuller (July 3, 1906 – October 20, 1994) was an American biographer, translator and fiction writer, who was known chiefly as a Flaubert scholar.

Life and career
Born in New Haven, Connecticut, Steegmuller graduated from Columbia University in 1927. He contributed numerous short stories and articles to The New Yorker and also wrote under the pseudonyms of Byron Steel and David Keith. He won two National Book Awards—one in 1971 for Arts and Letters for his biography of Jean Cocteau (Cocteau: A Biography), another in 1981 for Translation for the first volume of Flaubert's selected letters (The Letters of Gustave Flaubert 1830-1857)—and the American Academy of Arts and Letters Gold Medal. His first wife was Beatrice Stein, a painter who was a pupil and friend of Jacques Villon; she died in 1961. He married the writer Shirley Hazzard in 1963. His collected papers are held at two universities: at Yale University, the James Jackson Jarves (1818–1888) Papers and the Francis Steegmuller Collection for Jacques Villon; at Columbia University, the Francis Steegmuller Papers 1877–1979. He died in Naples, Italy.

Works

Nonfiction
Sir Francis Bacon: the first modern mind (Garden City, N.Y.: Doubleday, Doran, 1930)
 America on Relief (New York: Harcourt, Brace & Co., 1938 with Marie Dresden Lane)
 Flaubert and Madame Bovary: A Double Portrait (New York: Viking Press, 1939)
 Maupassant: A Lion In The Path (New York: Random House, 1949)
 The Two Lives of James Jackson Jarves (New Haven: Yale University Press, 1951)
 The Grand Mademoiselle (New York: Farrar, Straus and Cudahy, 1956)
 Apollinaire: Poet Among the Painters (New York: Farrar, Straus & Company, 1963)
 Jacques Villon, master printmaker. An exhibition at R.M. Light & Co., Helene C. Seiferheld Gallery inc., New York, February, 1964. (New York: High Grade Press, 1964)
 Cocteau: A Biography (Boston: Atlantic-Little, Brown, 1970)
 Stories and True Stories (Boston: The Atlantic Monthly Press, 1972)
 "Your Isadora": The Love Story of Isadora Duncan & Gordon Craig (New York: Random House, 1974)
 Catherine McNamara, School days remembered : oral history interview with Francis Steegmuller (Oral history project. Friends of the Greenwich Library), (Greenwich, CT: Greenwich Library, 1978)
 A Woman, A Man, And Two Kingdoms: The Story of Madame d'Épinay and the Abbé Galiani (New York: Alfred A. Knopf, Inc., 1991)

Translations
 Gustave Flaubert, The Selected Letters of Gustave Flaubert (The Great Letters Series) (New York: Farrar, Straus & Young, 1953)
 Gustave Flaubert, Madame Bovary (New York: Random House for the Book of the Month Club, 1957)
 Gustave Flaubert, A Letter from Gustave Flaubert, illustrated by Leonard Baskin (Northampton, MA: Gehenna Press, 1960)
 Edward Lear, Le Hibou et la Poussiquette, Edward Lear's The Owl and the Pussycat freely translated into French, illustrated by Barbara Cooney (Boston: Little, Brown & Co., 1961)
 Charles Augustin Sainte-Beuve, Selected Essays, translated from the French with Norbert Guterman (Garden City, NY: Doubleday & Co., 1963)
 Eugene Field, Papillot, Clignot et Dodo, Eugene Field's Wynken, Blynken, and Nod freely translated into French with Norbert Guterman, illustrated by Barbara Cooney (New York: Ariel Books, 1964)
 Gustave Flaubert, Intimate Notebook 1840-1841 (Garden City, NY: Doubleday & Co., 1967)
 Gustave Flaubert, Flaubert in Egypt: A Sensibility on Tour (Boston: Little, Brown & Co., 1972)
 Gustave Flaubert, The Letters of Gustave Flaubert 1830-1857 (Cambridge: Harvard University Press, 1980)
 Gustave Flaubert, The Letters of Gustave Flaubert, 1857-1880 (Cambridge: Harvard University Press, 1982)
 Gustave Flaubert, George Sand, Flaubert-Sand: The Correspondence, translated with Barbara Bray (London: Harvill, 1993)

Novels
 O Rare Ben Jonson (New York: Alfred A. Knopf, Inc., 1928 under the name Byron Steel)
 A Matter of Iodine (New York: Dodd, Mead & Co., 1940 under the name David Keith)
 A Matter of Accent (New York: Dodd, Mead & Co., 1943 under the name David Keith)
 States of Grace (New York: Reynal & Hitchcock, 1946)
 The Blue Harpsichord (New York: Dodd, Mead & Co., 1949 under the name David Keith)
 The Christening Party (New York: Farrar, Straus & Cudahy, 1960)
 Silence at Salerno: A comedy of intrigue (New York: Holt, Rinehart and Winston, 1978)

Short stories
French Follies and Other Follies: 20 stories from The New Yorker (New York: Reynal & Hitchcock, 1946)

Travel books
Java-Java (New York: Alfred A. Knopf, Inc., 1928 under the name Byron Steel)
Let's Visit Belgium (New York: J. Messner, Inc., 1938)
The Ancient Shore: Dispatches from Naples (Chicago: University of Chicago Press, 2008) (with Shirley Hazzard)

Magazine and newspaper articles
Duchamp: Fifty Years After, Show, February 1963
An Angel, A Flower, A Bird (profile of Barbette), The New Yorker, September 27, 1969
 "Francis Steegmuller: A Life of Letters." Interview by Lucy Latane Gordon. Wilson Library Bulletin (January, 1992): 62-64, 136.

Quotations
"I’m told that when Auden died, they found his Oxford [English Dictionary] all but clawed to pieces. That is the way a poet and his dictionary should come out."

See also
 Jacques Barzun
 Barbara Bray
 Ralph Ellison
 Clifton Fadiman
 Norbert Guterman
 Shirley Hazzard
 List of translators
 William Maxwell
 Meyer Shapiro
 Translation

References

Further reading

Correspondence
Alfred H. Barr, Jr. Papers in The Museum of Modern Art Archives
Series 1: Correspondence
Folder 1.61 mf 2168:401, Title S 1942, Steegmuller, Francis
Folder 1.303 mf 2183:1292, mf 2184:4, Title Fire Letters 1958, Steegmuller, Francis
William A. Bradley Literary Agency Records, 1909-1982, Harry Ransom Humanities Center, The University of Texas at Austin
Series I. Author Correspondence, 1909-1982, Box 58 Folder 8, Steegmuller, Francis, 1928-1982.
The John Malcolm Brinnin Papers, 1930 - 1981, Special Collections, University of Delaware Library
Series I. Literary and professional correspondence, 1930 - 1982, Box 19 Folder 408, Steegmuller, Francis, 1906-,
1971 Oct 25 ALS 2p
1972 Jun 22 ACS 1p
Cummings, E.E. (Edward Estlin), 1894-1962. Papers , Houghton Library, Harvard College Library, Harvard University, Cambridge, Massachusetts 02138
Series: I. MS Am 1823: Letters to E. E. Cummings, (1261) Steegmuller, Francis, 1906- 3 letters; 1959-1962.
Series: II. MS Am 1823.1: Letters from E. E. Cummings, (353) King, Madeleine, recipient. 1 letter; [1959] Includes letters to Stephen K. Oberbeck, Charlotte B. Howe, Mae Ward and F. Steegmuller
Series: III. MS Am 1823.2: Letters to Marion (Morehouse) Cummings, (241) Steegmuller, Francis, 1906- 1 letter; 1959.
Mina Kirstein Curtiss Papers, 1913-2005, Sophia Smith Collection, Smith College, Northampton, Mass.
Series III. Correspondence, (1913–85), Box 15 Folder 6, Steegmuller, Francis,  1948–84, n.d.
Levin, Harry, 1912-1994. Papers, Houghton Library, Harvard College Library, Harvard University, Cambridge, Massachusetts 02138
Series: I. Correspondence, (939) Steegmuller, Francis, 1906-. Correspondence with Harry Levin, 1954-1987. 3 folders.
Series: III. Other correspondence
B. Letters to Elena Levin, (1226) Steegmuller, Francis, 1906-. Letter to Elena Levin, 1970. 1 folder.
C. Correspondence by others, (1261) Bond, W.H. (William Henry), 1915-. Letters to others, 1966-1978. 1 folder. Includes letters to Francis Steegmuller, The Times Literary Supplement, and Jeremy Treglown.
Jacques Seligmann & Co. Records, 1904-1978 in the Archives of American Art, Smithsonian Institution
Series 1: Correspondence, 1913-1978; 1.3: General Correspondence, 1913-1978
Box 091, Steegmuller, Francis, 1946-1956
Series 2: Collectors Files, 1904-1977, undated; 2.1: Collectors, 1908, 1917-1977, undated
Box 208, Steegmuller, Francis, undated
Francis Steegmuller Correspondence with Charles Antin, Department of Special Collections & University Archives, McFarlin Library, The University of Tulsa
33 autograph and typescript postcards and letters dating from 1965 to 1978 from Francis Steegmuller to Charles Antin of Viking Press, all relating to Steegmuller's translation of Flaubert's Novembre.

Biographical references
Many of the pages cited below can be read on Google Books if you click on the title of the book.
Julian Barnes, Nothing to be frightened of (New York: Alfred A. Knopf, 2008), pp. 132, 166, 168
Hyman Bogen,  The Luckiest Orphans: a history of the Hebrew Orphan Asylum in New York (Champaign, IL: University of Illinois Press, 1992), p. 219
Barbara A. Burkhardt, William Maxwell: a literary life (Champaign, IL: University of Illinois Press, 2005), pp. 189–190, 196, 260, 271
Richard M. Cook,  Alfred Kazin: a biography (New Haven: Yale University Press, 2007), pp. 237–238, 388-389, 395
Scott Donaldson, John Cheever: a biography (Lincoln, NE: iUniverse, Inc., 2001), pp. 158, 254
Richard Greene, editor, Graham Greene: a life in letters (London: Little, Brown, 2007), pp. 330–1, 332
Lawrence Jackson, Ralph Ellison: emergence of genius (New York: John Wiley & Sons, Inc., 2002), pp. 369, 376, 383, 384, 413
Greg Johnson, editor, The Journal of Joyce Carol Oates 1973 - 1982 (New York: Ecco, 2007), p. 469
Catherine McNamara, School days remembered: oral history interview with Francis Steegmuller (Oral history project. Friends of the Greenwich Library), (Greenwich, CT: Greenwich Library, 1978)
David Marr, editor,  Letters / Patrick White (Chicago: The University of Chicago Press, 1996), pp. 474, 499, 528, 530, 532-3, 575, 625, 637, 643
Albert Murray, John F. Callahan, eds., Trading Twelves: the selected letters of Ralph Ellison and Albert Murray (New York: The Modern Library, 2000), pp. 6, 10, 23, 26, 160, 165
Graham Payn, Sheridan Morley, eds., The Noël Coward Diaries (Cambridge, Massachusetts: Da Capo Press, 2000), p. 623
Arnold Rampersad,  Ralph Ellison: a biography (New York: Alfred A. Knopf, 2007), pp. 172, 212-13, 215, 216, 232, 233, 236-7, 240, 241, 242, 250, 259, 331, 332, 405
Ned Rorem, The Later Diaries 1961–1972 (Cambridge, Massachusetts: Da Capo Press, 2000), pp. 196, 277, 319–320, 343
Martin Stannard,  Muriel Spark: the biography (New York: W. W. Norton & Company, 2010), pp. 271–2, 274, 276, 284, 299, 404
Diana Trilling,  The Beginning of the Journey: the marriage of Diana and Lionel Trilling (New York: Harcourt Brace & Company, 1993), pp. 83, 122
Alec Wilkinson, My Mentor: a young man's friendship with William Maxwell (New York: Houghton Mifflin Company, 2002), pp. 110, 126, 146
Alan Ziegler, The Writing Workshop Note Book: notes on creating and workshopping (Berkeley, CA: Soft Skull Press, 2008), p. 12

External links
Francis Steegmuller Papers 1877-1979, Rare Book and Manuscript Library, Columbia University Libraries
Francis Steegmuller Collection of Jacques Villon. General Collection, Beinecke Rare Book and Manuscript Library, Yale University
James Jackson Jarves (1818-1888) Papers, Manuscripts and Archives, Yale University Library
Francis Steegmuller, 88, Dies; Writer and Flaubert Expert, New York Times Obituary, 22 October 1994.
Criterion Collection essay for Jean Cocteau's Beauty and the Beast (1946 film) by Francis Steegmuller
Barbara Cooney Papers, Archives & Special Collections at the Thomas J. Dodd Research Center, University of Connecticut Libraries
The Greenwich Library Oral History Project for School days remembered: oral history interview with Francis Steegmuller by Catherine McNamara. A copy of this interview may be purchased at the Oral History Project office.

1906 births
1994 deaths
Columbia College (New York) alumni
National Book Award winners
20th-century American novelists
American male novelists
20th-century American male writers